Triumph and Power is the seventh full-length album by Swedish heavy metal band Grand Magus.  It was released on 31 January 2014 on Nuclear Blast.  Vocalist JB Christofferson described the album as "really powerful, majestic and less 'hard rocky' than" previous album, The Hunt (2012).  Christofferson described Triumph and Power as "really the essence of this band".

Recording
Grand Magus continued its concern with obtaining a strong drum sound, which Christofferson identified as a reaction against the strong focus on the guitar sound.  He noted that in heavy metal the drums are extremely important, maybe more important than many people realize. There has been a tendency in "modern" metal to focus too much on a fat guitar sound, resulting in really weak sounding or fake sounding drums. In my experience, the fat guitar sound is a result of the combination of drums and bass guitar, rather than using all space/frequencies for the guitars. You have to have a really solid foundation to make things explode, hence the focus on the drums.

Track listing
"On Hooves of Gold" – 5:24
"Steel versus Steel" – 5:19
"Fight" – 4:06
"Triumph and Power" – 4:52
"Dominator" – 4:20
"Arv" – 1:57
"Holmgång" – 3:38
"The Naked and the Dead" – 3:02
"Ymer" – 2:54
"The Hammer Will Bite" – 6:54
"Blackmoon" – 3:45 (digipak bonus track)

Personnel 
Janne "JB" Christoffersson – vocals, guitars
Mats "Fox" Skinner – bass
Ludwig "Ludde" Witt – drums

References 

Grand Magus albums
2014 albums
Nuclear Blast albums